Los Angeles is the third album by Japanese rock band The Brilliant Green, released in 2001. This album represented a shift in the band's sound, from the 1960s-influenced jangle pop to a darker, heavier early 1990s shoegaze sound. When The Brilliant Green was featured on Time Magazine's "Ten Best Bands On Planet Earth" article, it was Los Angeles that was listed as their key album.

Track listing

Notes

External links
Time's list of top ten non-American bands

2001 albums
The Brilliant Green albums